Pañcastikayasara (en: the essence of reality), is an ancient Jain text authored by Acharya Kundakunda. Kundakunda explains the Jain concepts of dravya (substance) and Ethics. The work serves as a brief version of the Jaina philosophy. There are total 180 verses written in Prakrit language. The text is about five (panch) āstikāya, substances that have both characteristics, viz. existence as well as body.

Āstikāya 

The five āstikāya mentioned in the text are :— 
Jīva (soul),
 Pudgala (matter),
Dharma (medium of motion),
Adharma (medium of rest), and
Akasa (space)

Notes

References

 

Atomism
Jain texts
Ancient Indian literature